St. Eleftherios Church may refer to one of two churches in Bucharest, Romania:

New St. Eleftherios Church
Old St. Eleftherios Church